Ghana AIDS Commission is a supra-ministerial and multi-sectorial body in Ghana. It was established by Act 2016, Act 938 of the Parliament of Ghana. It consists of 47 members including the President and the Vice President, 15 Ministers of State and two members of the Parliament.

Mission 
Ghana AIDS Commission aims to establish policies on the HIV and AIDS epidemic. It also directs activities in response to HIV and AIDS in Ghana.

HIV in Ghana

References 

Organisations based in Ghana